Akbari (also Romanized as Akbarī) is a village in Rostam-e Seh Rural District, Sorna District, Rostam County, Fars Province, Iran. At the 2006 census, its population was 673, in 131 families.

References 

Populated places in Rostam County